Seo-hyun, also spelled Seo-hyeon, or Seo-hyon, Suh-hyun, Suh-hyon is a Korean unisex given name. The meaning differs based on the hanja used to write each syllable of the name. There are 53 hanja with the reading  "seo" and 42 hanja with the reading "hyun" on the South Korean government's official list of hanja which may be used in given names. Seo-hyun was the 2nd-most popular name for baby girls in South Korea in 2011, and among the top 5 most popular name in 2008, 2009, 2011 and 2013.

People with this name include:

Yun Seo-hyeon (born 1970), South Korean actor
Lee Seo-hyun (born 1973), South Korean Businesswoman, Chairman of Samsung Welfare Foundation
Seo-hyun (born Seo Ju-hyun, 1991), South Korean singer and actress
Katie Kim (born Kim Seo-hyeon, 1993), South Korean-born American singer
Doo-young (born Choi Seo-hyun, 1998), South Korean rapper
Ahn Seo-hyun (born 2004), South Korean actress

See also
List of Korean given names

References

Korean unisex given names